Early Independent School District is a public school district based in Early, Texas (USA).

In 2009, the school district was rated "recognized" by the Texas Education Agency.

References

External links
Early ISD

School districts in Brown County, Texas